the World Checklist of Selected Plant Families recognises about 450 accepted taxa (of species and infraspecific names) in the plant genus Panicum.

A

 Panicum abscissum  
 Panicum aciculare  
 Panicum acicularifolium  
 Panicum acostia  
 Panicum acrotrichum  
 Panicum acuminatum  
 Panicum adenophorum  
 Panicum adenorhachis  
 Panicum aequinerve  
 Panicum aequivaginatum  
 Panicum afzelii  
 Panicum agrostoides  
 Panicum alatum  
 Panicum aldabrense  
 Panicum altum  
 Panicum amarum  – bitter panicum
 Panicum ambositrense  
 Panicum amoenum  
 Panicum anabaptistum  
 Panicum anceps  – beaked panicum
 Panicum andreanum  
 Panicum andringitrense  
 Panicum animarum  
 Panicum antidotale  – blue panicum
 Panicum aquarum  
 Panicum aquaticum  
 Panicum arctum  
 Panicum arcurameum  
 Panicum aristellum  
 Panicum arundinariae  
 Panicum assumptionis  
 Panicum assurgens  
 Panicum atrosanguineum  
 Panicum auricomum  
 Panicum auritum  
 Panicum aztecanum

B
 Panicum bahiense  
 Panicum bambusiculme  
 Panicum bambusiusculum  
 Panicum bartlettii  
 Panicum bartowense  
 Panicum bathiei  
 Panicum bechuanense  
 Panicum beecheyi  
 Panicum bergii  
 Panicum beyeri  
 Panicum biglandulare  
 Panicum bisulcatum  
 Panicum bombycinum  
 Panicum boreale  
 Panicum boscii  
 Panicum brachyanthum  
 Panicum brachystachyum  
 Panicum brazzavillense  
 Panicum bresolinii  
 Panicum brevifolium  

 Panicum bullockii  
 Panicum buncei

C

 Panicum caaguazuense  
 Panicum cabrerae  
 Panicum callosum  
 Panicum calocarpum  
 Panicum calvum  
 Panicum campestre  
 Panicum caparaoense  
 Panicum capillare  – witchgrass, tumbleweed
 Panicum capillarioides  
 Panicum caricoides  
 Panicum carneovaginatum  
 Panicum caudiglume  
 Panicum cayennense  
 Panicum cayoense  
 Panicum cervicatum  
 Panicum chambeshii  
 Panicum chapadense  
 Panicum chaseae  
 Panicum chillagoanum  
 Panicum chionachne  
 Panicum chloroleucum  
 Panicum chnoodes  
 Panicum cinctum  
 Panicum cipoense  
 Panicum clandestinum  
 Panicum claytonii  
 Panicum colonum  –  jungle rice (synonym of Echinochloa colona)
 Panicum coloratum  –  kleingrass, coolah grass, Bambatsi panic
 Panicum combsii  
 Panicum commutatum  
 Panicum comorense  
 Panicum complanatum  
 Panicum condensatum  
 Panicum congestum  
 Panicum congoense  
 Panicum cordovense  
 Panicum crateriferum  
 Panicum cristatellum  
 Panicum crus-galli  – barnyard grass (synonym of Echinochloa crus-galli)
 Panicum cucaense  
 Panicum cumbucanum  
 Panicum cupressifolium  
 Panicum curviflorum  
 Panicum cyanescens  
 Panicum cynodon

D

 Panicum davidsei  
 Panicum decaryanum  
 Panicum deciduum  
 Panicum decolorans  
 Panicum decompositum  – native millet
 Panicum delicatulum  
 Panicum depauperatum  
 Panicum deustum  
 Panicum dewinteri  
 Panicum dichotomiflorum  – fall panicgrass
 Panicum dichotomum  
 Panicum diffusum  
 Panicum dinklagei  
 Panicum discrepans  
 Panicum dorsense  
 Panicum dregeanum  
 Panicum durifolium

E

 Panicum ecklonii  
 Panicum effusum  – hairy panic
 Panicum eickii  
 Panicum elegantissimum  
 Panicum elephantipes  
 Panicum eliasi  
 Panicum eligulatum  
 Panicum ensifolium  
 Panicum ephemeroides  
 Panicum ephemerum  
 Panicum erectifolium  
 Panicum euprepes  
 Panicum exiguum

F

 Panicum fauriei  – Faurie's panicgrass
 Panicum filifolium  
 Panicum fischeri  
 Panicum flacciflorum  
 Panicum flexile  
 Panicum fluviicola  
 Panicum fontanale  
 Panicum fonticola  
 Panicum funaense  
 Panicum furvum

G
 Panicum gardneri  
 Panicum genuflexum  
 Panicum ghiesbreghtii  
 Panicum gilvum  
 Panicum glabripes  
 Panicum glanduliferum  
 Panicum glandulopaniculatum  
 Panicum glaucocladum  
 Panicum glaziovii  
 Panicum gouinii  
 Panicum graciliflorum  
 Panicum grande  
 Panicum grandiflorum  
 Panicum graniflorum  
 Panicum granuliferum  
 Panicum griffonii  
 Panicum guatemalense  
 Panicum gymnocarpum

H
 Panicum habrothrix  
 Panicum haenkeanum  
 Panicum hallii  
 Panicum hanningtonii  
 Panicum haplocaulos  
 Panicum havardii  – Havard's panicgrass
 Panicum hayatae  
 Panicum hebotes  
 Panicum heliophilum  
 Panicum helopus  – annual signal grass (synonym of Urochloa panicoides)
 Panicum hemitomon  – maidencane
 Panicum hillebrandianum  
 Panicum hillmanii  
 Panicum hippothrix  
 Panicum hirstii  
 Panicum hirsutum  
 Panicum hirticaule  – Mexican panicgrass
 Panicum hirtum  
 Panicum hispidifolium  
 Panicum hochstetteri  
 Panicum homblei  
 Panicum humbertii  
 Panicum humidorum  
 Panicum humile  
 Panicum hygrocharis  
 Panicum hylaeicum  
 Panicum hymeniochilum

I
 Panicum ibitense  
 Panicum ichunense  
 Panicum impeditum  
 Panicum inaequilatum  
 Panicum incisum  
 Panicum incomtum  
 Panicum incumbens  
 Panicum infestum  
 Panicum irregulare  
 Panicum isachnoides  
 Panicum issongense  
 Panicum itatiaiae

J
 Panicum jauanum

K

 Panicum kalaharense  
 Panicum kasumense  
 Panicum khasianum  
 Panicum konaense  
 Panicum koolauense  
 Panicum lachnophyllum

L

 Panicum lacustre  
 Panicum laetum  
 Panicum laevinode  
 Panicum lagostachyum  
 Panicum lanipes  
 Panicum larcomianum  
 Panicum laticomum  
 Panicum latifolium  
 Panicum latissimum  
 Panicum latzii  
 Panicum laxiflorum  
 Panicum leibergii  
 Panicum lepidulum  
 Panicum leptachne  
 Panicum leptolomoides  
 Panicum ligulare  
 Panicum lineale  
 Panicum linearifolium  
 Panicum longiloreum  
 Panicum longipedicellatum  
 Panicum longissimum  
 Panicum longivaginatum  
 Panicum longum  
 Panicum loreum  
 Panicum lukwangulense  
 Panicum luridum  
 Panicum lutzii  
 Panicum luzonense 
 Panicum lycopodioides

M

 Panicum machrisianum  
 Panicum madipirense  
 Panicum magnispicula  
 Panicum mahafalense  
 Panicum malacophyllum  
 Panicum malacotrichum  
 Panicum manongarivense  
 Panicum mapalense  
 Panicum marauense  
 Panicum margaritiferum  
 Panicum massaiense  
 Panicum maximum  – Guinea grass, buffalo grass
 Panicum merkeri  
 Panicum mertensii  
 Panicum micranthum  
 Panicum miliaceum  – proso millet, common millet
 Panicum millegrana  
 Panicum mindanaense  
 Panicum missionum  
 Panicum mitchellii  
 Panicum mitopus  
 Panicum mlahiense  
 Panicum mohavense  
 Panicum molinioides  
 Panicum monticola  
 Panicum mucronulatum  
 Panicum mueense  
 Panicum mystasipum

N

 Panicum natalense  
 Panicum neoperrieri  
 Panicum nephelophilum  
 Panicum nervatum  
 Panicum nervosum  
 Panicum nigerense  
 Panicum nigromarginatum  
 Panicum niihauense  – lau 'ehu
 Panicum nodatum  
 Panicum notatum  
 Panicum noterophilum  
 Panicum novemnerve  
 Panicum nudicaule  
 Panicum nudiflorum  
 Panicum nutabundum  
 Panicum nymphoides

O
 Panicum obseptum  
 Panicum obtusum  – vine mesquite grass
 Panicum oligosanthes  
 Panicum olyroides  
 Panicum omega  
 Panicum orinocanum  
 Panicum ovale  
 Panicum ovuliferum

P

 Panicum paianum  
 Panicum palauense  
 Panicum paludosum  
 Panicum pampinosum  
 Panicum pandum  
 Panicum pansum  
 Panicum pantrichum  
 Panicum parcum  
 Panicum parvifolium  
 Panicum parviglume  
 Panicum paucinode  
 Panicum pearsonii  
 Panicum pectinellum  
 Panicum pedersenii  
 Panicum pedicellatum  
 Panicum peladoense  
 Panicum pellitum  
 Panicum penicillatum  
 Panicum perangustatum  
 Panicum peristypum  
 Panicum perlongum  
 Panicum perrieri  
 Panicum peteri  
 Panicum petersonii  
 Panicum petilum  
 Panicum petrense  
 Panicum petropolitanum  
 Panicum philadelphicum  
 Panicum phippsii  
 Panicum phoiniclados  
 Panicum phragmitoides  
 Panicum piauiense  
 Panicum pilgeri  
 Panicum pilgerianum  
 Panicum pilosum  
 Panicum pinifolium  
 Panicum pleianthum  
 Panicum plenum  
 Panicum poioides  
 Panicum pole-evansii  
 Panicum poliophyllum  
 Panicum polyanthes  
 Panicum polycomum  
 Panicum polygonatum  
 Panicum porphyrrhizos  
 Panicum portoricense  
 Panicum praealtum  
 Panicum prionitis  
 Panicum prolutum  
 Panicum pseudisachne  
 Panicum pseudoracemosum  
 Panicum pseudowoeltzkowii  
 Panicum pulchellum  
 Panicum pusillum  
 Panicum pycnoclados  
 Panicum pygmaeum  – Australian native dwarf panicum, rainforest panicum
 Panicum pyrularium  
 Panicum quadriglume

Q
 Panicum queenslandicum

R
 Panicum racemosum  
 Panicum ramosum  – browntop millet 
 Panicum ramosius  
 Panicum ravenelii  
 Panicum repens  – torpedo grass
 Panicum restingae  
 Panicum rhizogonum  
 Panicum rigidum  
 Panicum rivale  
 Panicum robustum  
 Panicum robynsii  
 Panicum rudgei  
 Panicum rupestre  
 Panicum ruspolii  
 Panicum sabulorum

S

 Panicum sacciolepoides  
 Panicum sadinii  
 Panicum sarmentosum  
 Panicum scabridum  
 Panicum scabriusculum  
 Panicum schinzii  
 Panicum schwackeanum  
 Panicum sciurotis  
 Panicum sciurotoides  
 Panicum scoparium  
 Panicum sellowii  
 Panicum seminudum  
 Panicum shinyangense  
 Panicum simile  
 Panicum simulans  
 Panicum sipapoense  
 Panicum smithii  
 Panicum socotranum  
 Panicum soderstromii  
 Panicum sparsicomum  
 Panicum spergulifolium  
 Panicum sphaerocarpon  
 Panicum spongiosum  
 Panicum stagnatile  
 Panicum stapfianum  
 Panicum stenodes  
 Panicum stevensianum  
 Panicum steyermarkii  
 Panicum stigmosum  
 Panicum stipiflorum  
 Panicum stoloniferum  
 Panicum stramineum  
 Panicum strictissimum  
 Panicum strigosum  
 Panicum subalbidum  
 Panicum subflabellatum  
 Panicum subhystrix  
 Panicum sublaeve  
 Panicum subtilissimum  
 Panicum subtiramulosum  
 Panicum subulatum  
 Panicum subxerophilum  
 Panicum sumatrense  – little millet
 Panicum superatum  
 Panicum surrectum

T

 Panicum tamaulipense  
 Panicum telmatum  
 Panicum tenellum  
 Panicum tenerum  
 Panicum tenuifolium  
 Panicum tepuianum  
 Panicum teretifolium  
 Panicum tijucae  
 Panicum torridum  
 Panicum trachyrhachis  
 Panicum trhachyrachis  
 Panicum trichanthum  
 Panicum trichidiachne  
 Panicum trichocladum  
 Panicum trichoides  
 Panicum tricholaenoides  
 Panicum trichonode  
 Panicum trinii  
 Panicum turgidum  – afezu

U
 Panicum umbonulatum  
 Panicum urvilleanum  – desert panicgrass

V

 Panicum vaginiviscosum  
 Panicum validum  
 Panicum vaseyanum  
 Panicum vatovae  
 Panicum venezuelae  
 Panicum verrucosum  
 Panicum virgatum  – switchgrass
 Panicum viscidellum  
 Panicum voeltzkowii  
 Panicum vollesenii  
 Panicum volutans  
 Panicum wettsteinii

W
 Panicum wiehei  
 Panicum wilcoxianum

X

 Panicum xanthophysum  
 Panicum xerophilum

Y
 Panicum yavitaense

Z
 Panicum zambesiense

Synonyms
 Panicum tuerckheimii  = Aakia tuerckheimii (Hack.) J.R. Grande, 2014

References

List
Panicum